Ascension Lutheran School may refer to:

 Ascension Lutheran School, Thousand Oaks, a Lutheran school in the United States
 Ascension Lutheran School, Torrance, California
 Ascension Lutheran School (Prince George's County, Maryland), a  school in Prince George's County, Maryland